Sônia Bone de Souza Silva Santos (born 6 March 1974), usually known as Sônia Guajajara, is a Brazilian indigenous activist, environmentalist, and politician. A member of the Socialism and Liberty Party (PSOL), she was initially a candidate for President of Brazil in the 2018 Brazilian general election, before being chosen as the vice presidential running mate of nominee Guilherme Boulos. This made her the first indigenous person to run for a federal executive position in Brazil. In 2022, Guajajara was named one of the 100 most influential people in the world by Time.

Early life 

Sônia Guajajara was born to a Guajajara family on Araribóia Indigenous Land, located in the Amazonian rainforest in the northeastern state of Maranhão. At the age of 15, she left home at the invitation of FUNAI and moved to Minas Gerais, where she completed her initial education at an agricultural boarding school.

Guajajara became interested in politics at a very young age, and stated, "I was born an activist. I’ve spent my whole life fighting against anonymity, against indigenous peoples’ invisibility. I always wanted to find a path, a way to bring the history and way of life of the indigenous people to light for society as a whole."

Guajajara would later attend the Federal University of Maranhão, located in the state capital of São Luís. Guajajara additionally holds a master’s degree in culture and society from the Institute of Humanities, Arts, and Culture at the Federal University of Bahia. Following graduation, Guajajara worked in a variety of professions, including as a teacher and as a nurse.

Activism and honors 

Guajajara is the leader of the Articulação dos Povos Indígenas do Brasil (Articulation of the Indigenous Peoples of Brazil, or "APIB"), an organization that represents around 300 indigenous ethnic groups in Brazil.

As an activist, she has been at odds with the ruralistas in the National Congress, a group of conservative legislators allied with agribusiness interests who favor further development on public lands.

Guajajara strongly opposes efforts to contact uncontacted peoples in the Amazon Rainforest. Guajajara has described President Jair Bolsonaro as "a threat to the planet" due to his deforestation policies. In 2020, she called for urgent environmental action amid the COVID-19 pandemic.

During her time as an activist, she has organized a number of demonstrations in support of indigenous rights in Brazil, and facilitated a meeting of indigenous leaders with then-President Dilma Rousseff in 2013. In 2015, she was named to the Brazilian Ordem do Mérito Cultural. She was also awarded a medal by Maranhão state.

In March 2022 she was amongst 151 international feminists signing Feminist Resistance Against War: A Manifesto, in solidarity with the Feminist Anti-War Resistance initiated by Russian feminists after the Russian invasion of Ukraine.

Political career

Party politics 
Guajajara became a member of the Workers' Party (PT), the left-wing party that ruled Brazil from 2003 to 2016, in 2000. In 2011, Guajajara left the party due to its alliance with Roseana Sarney, a conservative politician who served as Governor of her home state of Maranhão. She later joined the Socialism and Liberty Party (PSOL), a socialist party initially founded by PT dissidents.

In the run-up to the 2014 presidential election, Guajajara criticized the presidency of Dilma Rousseff in an interview, stating that the "Dilma government was very bad for us". In the same interview, she also cautioned against the election of a right-wing Brazilian Social Democracy Party (PSDB) to the presidency. Despite her misgivings, Guajajara denounced the impeachment of Dilma Rousseff that led to the installation of Michel Temer as President, describing it as a "coup".

2018 presidential election 

In 2018, Guajajara announced her intention to run for President of Brazil as a member of PSOL. Her candidacy was backed by the support of the ecosocialist wing of the party. In the end, she was chosen by labor leader Guilherme Boulos to serve as his vice presidential running mate on the PSOL ticket. Guajajara was the first indigenous person to run for a federal executive office in Brazil.

2022 Chamber of Deputies election 
Guajajara was confirmed as a pre-candidate for federal deputy in the 2022 Brazilian general election. She was elected with 156,966 votes. In January 2023, President Luiz Inácio Lula da Silva appointed Guajajara to lead the Ministry of Indigenous Peoples. She was sworn in on 11 January 2023.

References 

1974 births
Living people
Socialism and Liberty Party politicians
Workers' Party (Brazil) politicians
Brazilian politicians of indigenous peoples descent
Brazilian women activists
Brazilian environmentalists
Brazilian women environmentalists
Ecofeminists
Indigenous activists of the Americas
People from Maranhão
Brazilian feminists
Indigenous feminists
Candidates for Vice President of Brazil
Indigenous women
Government ministers of Brazil
Women government ministers of Brazil